The Deputy Chief of Army (DCA) is the second most senior appointment in the Australian Army, responsible to the Chief of Army (CA). The rank associated with the position is major general (2-star). 

The current appointee is Major General Natasha Fox, who took up the posting on 2 February 2022.

Appointees
The following (incomplete) list chronologically records those who have held the post of Deputy Chief of Army or its preceding positions. Rank and honours are as at the completion of the individual's term.

References

Leadership of the Australian Defence Force